"Don't Rob Another Man's Castle" is a song written by Jenny Lou Carson.  The song was first performed by Eddy Arnold who reached No. 1 on the Folk Best Seller charts in 1949.

Cover versions
Later in 1949, Ernest Tubb and The Andrews Sisters along with The Texas Troubadors, took their version of the song to No. 10 on the Folk Best Seller List.  
in 1952, Guy Mitchell with accompaniment by Mitch Miller and his orchestra released their version.

References

1949 singles
Eddy Arnold songs
Ernest Tubb songs
The Andrews Sisters songs
Guy Mitchell songs
Songs written by Jenny Lou Carson
1949 songs